Alma Mater  is a Christmas album by Pope Benedict XVI, released in 2009.

References

2009 Christmas albums
Christmas albums by German artists
Works by Pope Benedict XVI